The Secret of My Success is a song performed by Night Ranger from their album Big Life as well as on the soundtrack to the 1987 comedy film, The Secret of My Success.

The star of the film, Michael J. Fox, was the person to request the band to write and record the song.  It reached No. 12 on the Hot Mainstream Rock Tracks chart and No. 64 on the Billboard Hot 100 chart in the U.S. The song was nominated for the Golden Globe Award in the category of Best Original Song in 1988, but lost to "(I've Had) The Time of My Life," the central theme of Dirty Dancing, played by Bill Medley and Jennifer Warnes. The video for the song featured Vince Neil, Tommy Lee and "Weird Al" Yankovic acting as a horn section.

Personnel
Band members
Brad Gillis - lead and rhythm guitars, backing vocals
Jeff Watson - lead and rhythm guitars
Jack Blades - bass, lead and backing vocals
Alan Fitzgerald - keyboards, piano
Kelly Keagy - drums, lead and backing vocals, percussion

Additional musicians
David Foster - additional keyboards
Michael Boddicker -  additional synth programming
David "Reverend" Boruff - additional synth programming
Tris Imboden - additional drum overdubs
Michael Landau - additional guitar
Bill Champlin - additional background vocals

References

1987 singles
Night Ranger songs
Songs written by David Foster
Song recordings produced by David Foster
Songs written for films
1987 songs
Songs written by Jack Blades
MCA Records singles